Here & Now (stylized as HERE&NOW) is the second album from the Malaysian rock band Pop Shuvit, released in 2005 by EMI Music Malaysia. The album had commercial success in Japan.

Track listing

Personnel
 Moots! - vocals
 JD - guitars
 AJ - bass
 Rudy - drums
 DJ Uno - turntables

References

External links
 Here & Now at AllMusic

2005 albums
Pop Shuvit albums